Test(s), testing, or TEST may refer to:

 Test (assessment), an educational assessment intended to measure the respondents' knowledge or other abilities

Arts and entertainment
 Test (2013 film), an American film
 Test (2014 film), a Russian film
 Test (group), a jazz collective
 Tests (album), a 1998 album by The Microphones
 Testing (album), an album by ASAP Rocky

Computing
 .test, a reserved top-level domain
 Software testing
 test (Unix), a Unix command for evaluating conditional expressions
 TEST (x86 instruction), an x86 assembly language instruction

People
 Test (wrestler), ring name for Andrew Martin (1975–2009), Canadian professional wrestler
 John Test (1771–1849), American politician
 Zack Test (born 1989), American rugby union player

Science and technology
 Experiment, a procedure carried out in order to test (support, refute, or validate) a hypothesis
 Statistical hypothesis testing, techniques to reach conclusions about probabilistic behavior
 Product testing
 System testing
 Mechanical testing
 Test equipment
 Stress testing
 Proof test, a stress test to demonstrate the fitness of a load-bearing structure
 Test (biology), the shell of sea urchins and certain microorganisms

Sports
 Test cricket, a series of matches played by two national representative teams
 Test match (rugby league), a match between teams of the Rugby League International Federation
 Test match (rugby union), an international match usually played between two senior national teams
 The Test (greyhound competition), a greyhound race run between 1941 and 2008

Other uses 
 River Test, a river in England
 Test (law), an applied method of evaluation used to resolve matters of jurisprudence

See also

 Tester (disambiguation), person or device that tests or measures
 The Test (disambiguation)
 
 
 Examination (disambiguation)
 Trial (disambiguation)
 Validation (disambiguation)
 Verification (disambiguation)